Aird an Rùnair is the most westerly point of the island of North Uist in the Western Isles of Scotland.

Notes

Headlands of Scotland
Landforms of the Outer Hebrides